The División Intermedia, the second division of Peruvian football (soccer) in 1984 until 1987. The tournament was played on a home-and-away round-robin basis.

History
Intermedia was a promotion championship in Peru between the First Division as a superior category and the Second Division and Copa Perú as lower categories. It was developed during the system of Regional Championships between 1984 and 1987.

As the First Division was divided into four zones: North, Center, South and Metropolitan. In the first three participated the worst of the respective zone in the First Division against teams from the Copa Peru. The best of each zone classified the First Division the following year while the rest returned to the Copa Peru.

In the case of the Metropolitan Area, it was divided into Intermedia A and Intermedia B. In Intermedia A, the worst of the Metropolitan Zone of the First and the best of the Second Division where the winners played in the First Division played. The rest of the Segunda Division teams played Intermedia B against the winners of the IV and IX regions of the Copa Peru to define who would face the Intermedia A teams that had not achieved the promotion in order to obtain the last places in the First Division. Intermedia B also left the team that returned to the Copa Peru that added to the descent of the Second Division tournament. Once both intermedia teams finished, the teams that did not manage to ascend to First and avoided the descent to Copa Peru played in the Second Division the following year.

Promotions

External links
 RSSSF

2
Peru
Defunct sports competitions in Peru